Featured here is a chronological (by publication) list of story arcs in writer Mark Millar's American superhero comic book series Jupiter's Legacy, and its spinoff miniseries, Jupiter's Circle. The first, five-issue volume of Jupiter's Legacy premiered in April 2013, and was published monthly by Image Comics, albeit with some delays. The first, six-issue volume of the spinoff Jupiter's Circle was published in April 2015, and the first issue of that spinoff's second volume was published in November 2015.

Jupiter's Legacy

Volume 1

Volume 2

Jupiter's Circle

Volume 1

Volume 2

References

Notes

Inline citations

External links

Jupiter's Legacy